Bremen II – Bremerhaven is an electoral constituency (German: Wahlkreis) represented in the Bundestag. It elects one member via first-past-the-post voting. Under the current constituency numbering system, it is designated as constituency 55. It is located in the state of Bremen, comprising western and northern parts of the city of Bremen and the exclave of Bremerhaven.

Bremen II – Bremerhaven was created for the inaugural 1949 federal election. Since 2017, it has been represented by Uwe Schmidt of the Social Democratic Party (SPD).

Geography
Bremen II – Bremerhaven is located in the state of Bremen. As of the 2021 federal election, it comprises the city of Bremerhaven, as well as from the city of Bremen the boroughs of West and Nord, the Stadtteil of Häfen from the borough of Mitte, and the Stadtteile of Woltmershausen and Ortsteile of Seehausen and Strom from the borough of Süd.

History
Bremen II – Bremerhaven was created in 1949, then known as Bremerhaven – Bremen-Nord. It acquired its current name in the 2002 election. In the inaugural Bundestag election, it was Bremen constituency 3 in the numbering system. From 1953 through 1961, it was number 59. From 1965 through 1998, it was number 52. In the 2002 and 2005 elections, it was number 55. In the 2009 election, it was number 56. Since the 2013 election, it has been number 55.

Originally, the constituency comprised the borough of Nord and the city of Bremerhaven. It acquired its current borders in the 2002 election.

Members
The constituency has been held continuously by the Social Democratic Party (SPD) since its creation. Its first representative was Bernhard Lohmüller, who served from 1949 until his death in 1952. He was succeeded by Philipp Wehr after a by-election. Wehr was subsequently re-elected in the 1953 and 1957 elections. Werner Lenz became representative in the 1961 election and served a single term. Harry Tallert then served from 1965 to 1972. Horst Grunenberg served five terms between 1972 and 1990. He was succeeded by Ilse Janz, who served until 2002. Uwe Beckmeyer was representative from 2002 to 2017. Uwe Schmidt has served since the 2017 election.

Election results

2021 election

2017 election

2013 election

2009 election

References

Federal electoral districts in Bremen (state)
Bremerhaven
Politics of Bremen (city)
1949 establishments in West Germany
Constituencies established in 1949